Hampton Township is located in Rock Island County, Illinois. As of the 2010 census, its population was 21,711 and it contained 9,119 housing units.

Early history
The first recorded birth in Hampton Township was Mary Ann McNeal, daughter of Mr. and Mrs. Henry McNeal, born Oct. 5, 1832.

The first recorded death occurred in 1829 on board the steamer Josephine. A woman from England was on her way to Galena to visit her son, and died just as the boat was landing. She was buried in Hampton.

In 1833 the first school in the township was established in a log cabin which had previously been used as a dwelling.

Geography

Demographics

References

External links
City-data.com
Illinois State Archives

Townships in Rock Island County, Illinois
Townships in Illinois